The Comfort Station is a historic "sanitary" on Blue Hill Avenue in Milton, Massachusetts.  It is located in the Blue Hills Reservation, managed by the Massachusetts Department of Conservation and Recreation.

Although finely detailed by Stickney & Austin in Swiss Chalet style, this is a very simple building, built in 1904 for a single purpose which it still performs today. It is approximately 35x22 feet (10x7m), divided approximately half and half between men's and women's toilets which sit on a terrazzo floor about five feet (1.5m) above grade. Two handicapped accessible toilets were added on the east (back) side during an extensive refurbishing in 2008. It is well preserved, with most exterior parts either original or carefully matched to the original.
It was originally adjacent to a trolley rest stop, but the trolley and the restaurant pavilion are long gone. It now serves visitors to the Department of Conservation and Recreation's Trailside Museum and people climbing Great Blue Hill, at whose base it sits.  The Trailside Museum is owned by DCR and operated by the 
Massachusetts Audubon Society through a 5-year permit agreement.

It was added to the National Register of Historic Places on September 25, 1980.

Gallery

See also
National Register of Historic Places listings in Milton, Massachusetts

References

Park buildings and structures on the National Register of Historic Places in Massachusetts
Buildings and structures completed in 1904
Buildings and structures in Norfolk County, Massachusetts
Milton, Massachusetts
National Register of Historic Places in Milton, Massachusetts